The 2006 Governor General's Awards for Literary Merit: Finalists in 14 categories (68 books) were announced October 16, winners announced November 21 and awards presented  December 13. The prize for writers and illustrators was $15,000 and "a specially bound copy of the winning book". 

In a novelty, the winners were announced at simultaneous press conferences in Toronto and Montreal, with English-language assembled in Toronto and French-language winners assembled in Montreal. The finale spanned two days in Ottawa, with presentations December 13 at Rideau Hall, the Governor General's residence; readings and books signings at Library and Archives Canada on December 14.

English

French

References

Governor General's Awards
Governor General's Awards
Governor General's Awards